China Seas may refer to:

 China Seas, group of marginal seas in Pacific
 China Seas, American 1935 adventure movie